Alan Byrne may refer to:

 Alan Byrne (footballer, born 1969), Irish football (soccer) player
 Alan Byrne (Gaelic footballer), Wicklow intercounty footballer
 Alan Byrne (hurler) (born 1985), Irish hurler

See also
Alan Burns (disambiguation)